Meleh Yaqub (also Romanized as Meleh Ya‘qūb; also known as Kāvālī Bānyāran-e Yār Moḩammad and Mollā Ya‘qūb) is a village in Qalkhani Rural District, Gahvareh District, Dalahu County, Kermanshah Province, Iran. At the 2006 census, its population was 69, in 19 families.

References 

Populated places in Dalahu County